The Echternach Music Festival was an international event which was held in May and June every year between 1975 and 2018 at Echternach in the east of Luxembourg. In addition to classical music, modern compositions were performed in the 18th century basilica of St Willibrord and in the church of St Peter and Paul. Since 2008, there has also been a jazz festival held in September and October. Over the years, renowned international artists such as Yehudi Menuhin, Gidon Kremer, Mstislav Rostropovitch, Maurice André, Dietrich Fischer-Dieskau, Yo-Yo Ma, Bobby McFerrin or Jordi Savall played alongside young talent from Luxembourg and abroad.  Musically speaking the Festival ranges from medieval and classic music to jazz and world music. The festival was discontinued in 2018 and succeeded by the Echterlive Festival in 2019.

External links
Festival International Echternach website
Echterlive Festival website

References

Jazz festivals in Luxembourg
Echternach